Don Segundo Sombra is a 1969 Argentine drama film directed by Manuel Antín, based on the novel of the same name. Winner of the Silver Condor Award for Best Film, it was entered into the 1970 Cannes Film Festival.

Plot
The story takes place in San Antonio de Areco, in the Argentine pampas. Fabio Cáceres remembers his childhood as an orphan and his youth working in the fields, alongside his godfather, Don Segundo Sombra, a lonely gaucho whom he admires and from whom he will learn to be a gaucho, following him in all his adventures. Don Segundo will be Fabio's role model.

Cast
 Héctor Alterio as Gaucho in Black
 Alejandra Boero as Quack Woman
 Juan Carvalledo as Fabio as Young Man
 Lito Cruz
 Luis Manuel de la Cuesta
 Juan Carlos Galván
 Juan Carlos Gené as Don Sixto
 Adolfo Guiraldes as Don Segundo Sombra
 Jorge Hacker
 Luis Medina Castro
 Soledad Silveyra as Aurora
 Fernando Vegal

References

External links

1969 films
1960s Spanish-language films
1969 drama films
Films directed by Manuel Antín
Argentine drama films
1960s Argentine films